"Bad Bad Boy" is a song and single by Scottish rock group Nazareth. It was first released in 1973.

Background and chart success
Musicians are Dan McCafferty on lead vocals, Darrell Sweet on percussion, Pete Agnew on bass guitar and Manny Charlton on electric guitar. The song came from their 1973 album Razamanaz. The song was the second of eleven of Nazareth's singles to chart in the UK. It reached 10 in 1973 staying for 9 weeks.

A 2010 re-issue of their 1973 album Loud 'n' Proud contained Bad Bad Boy as a bonus track not included on the original release. It was taken from a live recording from the Bob Harris show on BBC Radio.

References 

1973 songs
1973 singles
Nazareth (band) songs
Song recordings produced by Roger Glover
Mooncrest Records singles
Songs written by Dan McCafferty
Songs written by Darrell Sweet (musician)
Songs written by Manny Charlton